"I Won't Let You Go" is a song by British singer James Morrison. The song was released as the first single from his third studio album, The Awakening. The song was first released on 25 August 2011, with the first country receiving a release being Belgium.  According to Songfacts, Morrison wrote the mid-tempo ballad about Gill, his long-term girlfriend and the mother of his daughter. The song was used as a promo for the 2012 season of Home and Away.

Critical reception
Robert Copsey of Digital Spy gave the song an average review stating: ""Take a little time to hold yourself/ Take a little time to feel around," he insists in his unmistakable gruff tones, before the lilting guitars and gentle piano riff shift gear for the swaying, '60s slow-dance chorus. Truth be told there are more adventurous songs in his catalogue, but given his situation, we'd be inclined to play it safe too."

Jon O'Brien wrote for AllMusic that ""I Won't Let You Go" follows the same heartfelt, acoustic, tearjerker template as his previous two lead singles;." Pip Elwood wrote a positive review for "Entertainment Focus", stating that "The album’s lead single is a progression from Morrison’s usual sound. The stripped-back song is a heart-wrenching track with a passionate vocal from Morrison."

Chart performance
The song debuted at number five on the UK Singles Chart, becoming his third top-five hit and biggest hit since "Broken Strings" (2008). In the second week, the song dropped only one spot, falling to number six. Elsewhere in Europe, the song attained a lot of success. On the Austrian Singles Chart, the song was Morrison's first number-one single, surpassing his previous peak of number two, with the song "Broken Strings". In Australia, the song reached 13, Morrison's first appearance in the top 20 since "You Give Me Something" which reached number 7 in 2006.

Music video
A music video to accompany the release of "I Won't Let You Go" was first released onto YouTube on 4 August 2011 at a total length of three minutes and fifty-nine seconds. The video was shot at Wimbledon Studios, and directed by Phil Griffin. In the clip, Morrison wakes up to an empty bed, while somewhere in the city, his loved one is lying alone in the middle of the street. When he runs into her, he quickly offers his comfort and lies beside her.

Track listing

Charts

Weekly charts

Year-end charts

Certifications

Release history

Other versions
In 2013, Australian singer Taylor Henderson recorded a version for his album Taylor Henderson.

In April 2012, Daniel Evans, a finalist on The X Factor UK released an acoustic version on his YouTube channel. It also featured on his 2013 album Wicked Game.

References

2011 singles
James Morrison (singer) songs
Pop ballads
Number-one singles in Austria
Songs written by Martin Brammer